Decision to Leave is a 2022 South Korean romantic mystery film produced, co-written and directed by Park Chan-wook. It stars Tang Wei and Park Hae-il.

In April 2022, the film was selected to compete for the Palme d'Or at the 2022 Cannes Film Festival, where Park Chan-wook won Best Director. Decision to Leave was released theatrically on 29 June 2022 in South Korea. The film received critical acclaim and was nominated for numerous awards, including Best Film Not in the English Language and Best Direction at the 76th British Academy Film Awards. It was selected as the South Korean entry for the Best International Feature Film at the 95th Academy Awards, making the December shortlist. It was also named one of the top 5 international films of 2022 by the National Board of Review.

Plot

Insomniac detective Hae-Jun works in Busan and only sees his wife, Jung-An, a nuclear power plant worker residing in Ipo, once a week. Hae-Jun and his partner, Soo-Wan, encounter a case where a retired immigration officer, Ki Do Soo, is found dead at the foot of a mountain he often climbed. They interview his much younger wife, Seo-Rae, an emigrant from China who works as a caretaker for seniors. They suspect her because of her insufficient displays of grief, a scratch on her hand, bruises on her legs and torso, and a tattoo of Ki's initials in the manner that he marked his other belongings.

Hae-Jun conducts further interviews with Seo-Rae and conducts nightly stakeouts outside of Seo-Rae's apartment building, becoming infatuated with her in the process. Seo-Rae observes him outside her building, and witnesses one of his other investigations in turn. Seo-Rae's Monday client says Seo-Rae was with her on the day that Ki died, and camera footage is found showing Seo-Rae outside her Monday client's home shortly before Ki's time of death. Questioned about her background, Seo-Rae admits that in China she killed her mother with fentanyl pills; her mother was terminally ill and asked her to do so. Before dying, she told Seo-Rae to go to Korea to claim the mountain her Korean grandfather, an independence fighter in Manchuria, had left her. Seo-Rae gives Hae-Jun letters written by Ki admitting to being corrupt, including a letter sent to a subordinate that Hae-Jun interprets as a suicide note. Hae-Jun rules that the death was a suicide despite Soo-Wan's doubts and informs Seo-Rae that she is no longer a suspect.

Seo-Rae and Hae-Jun go on a date at a Buddhist temple, visit each other's homes, and become close. During a visit to his apartment, Seo-Rae burns Hae-Jun's photo evidence from her husband's case, reasoning that Hae-Jun's insomnia is caused by his haunting cases. One day, substituting for Seo-Rae at her Monday client, Hae-Jun learns that Seo-Rae and the client have the same model of cell phone, and that the client has dementia and does not know the day of the week. On the client's phone, he sees that the housebound woman apparently walked up 138 flights of stairs on the day of Ki's death. Hae-Jun realizes that Seo-Rae switched her phone for her client's and then climbed the mountain to push Ki off, resulting in her bruises and scratches. Confronting Seo-Rae in her apartment, he concludes that she also forged the suicide note and, to her consternation, accuses her of getting close to him to destroy his evidence. Hae-Jun tells Seo-Rae that she has destroyed his pride in his job and that, since meeting her, he has become "shattered"; nevertheless, he tells her that he has covered up the evidence and instructs her to throw the incriminating phone into the sea before leaving.

Thirteen months later, Hae-Jun has moved to Ipo to live with Jung-An after developing depression and more severe insomnia. At the fish market with Jung-An, he encounters Seo-Rae with her new husband Im Ho-Shin, a business investor. The next day, Ho-Shin is found dead in his mansion's swimming pool. Hae-Jun takes on the case and is convinced Seo-Rae is the culprit. She admits only to draining the pool so that Hae-Jun would not be disturbed by the blood. Sa Cheol-Seong, a Chinese immigrant, soon confesses to killing Ho-Shin for defrauding his late mother of millions of dollars. Sa denies that Seo-Rae played any role and reveals he had installed a tracker on Seo-Rae's phone so he could find where Ho-Shin lived.

Hae-Jun confronts Seo-Rae at the mountain her grandfather left her. She reaches Hae-Jun at the edge of the mountain and hugs him. Seo-Rae reveals that she kept the phone with incriminating evidence from Ki's case and proposes that he use it as a way to "reinvestigate" her. They kiss passionately. Jung-An leaves Hae-Jun when he returns home, suspecting his affair.

The next day, Hae-Jun learns from Sa that Seo-Rae visited Sa's mother in the hospital on the day that she died. He concludes that Seo-Rae slipped the mother the remaining fentanyl pills she had in her possession, knowing Sa would kill Ho-Shin as soon as his mother died. Hae-Jun tracks Seo-Rae's phone via the tracker Sa installed and chases her to a beach. Over the phone, she tells him that Ho-Shin had discovered a phone recording where Hae-Jun told Seo-Rae that he loved her, and that Ho-Shin had planned to expose their illicit relationship. Hae-Jun doesn't recall telling Seo-Rae that he loved her, though she says she began loving him as he stopped loving her. At the beach, he finds her empty car and the cell phone, which contains the recording of his instructions for Seo-Rae to destroy the phone with evidence from Ki's case. Further out on the shore, Seo-Rae digs a pit in the sand and gets in it as the tide rises, letting it drown and bury her. Hae-Jun arrives at the beach and is unable to find Seo-Rae, unaware that she is buried in the sand beneath him. He searches desperately for her and cries in anguish.

Cast

Production
The film is produced by Moho Film and is financed and distributed by CJ Entertainment. It began principal photography in October 2020.

Release
Decision to Leave was selected to compete for the Palme d'Or at the 2022 Cannes Film Festival to be held from 17 to 28 May 2022. It screened for the first time at the Lumière Grand Theater on 23 May 2022 and was subsequently released theatrically in South Korea on 29 June 2022. According to CJ E&M, the film was sold to 192 countries ahead of its premiere in competition at Cannes.

In April 2022, streaming service Mubi acquired the rights to release the film in North America, the United Kingdom and Ireland, India and Turkey, to be streamed after its theatrical release later in the year.

Decision to Leave had its North American premiere at the Toronto International Film Festival in September 2022, and its US premiere at Fantastic Fest Film Festival took place in the same month. It was released theatrically in the United States and United Kingdom on 14 October 2022, and was released in Australia theatrically by Madman Films on 20 October.

Reception

Box office
The film was released on 29 June 2022 on 1,374 screens. It opened at first place on Korean box office with 114,592 admissions. On 13 July, after two weeks of release, the film surpassed 1 million cumulative admissions.

, it is the tenth highest-grossing Korean film of 2022, with a gross of US$15,589,120 and 1,893,954 admissions.

Critical response
The website's critics consensus reads "If Decision to Leave isn't quite on the same level as Park Chan-wook's masterpieces, this romantic thriller is still a remarkable achievement by any other metric." Metacritic assigned the film a weighted average score of 84 out of 100 based on 44 critic reviews, indicating "universal acclaim".

David Rooney of The Hollywood Reporter, praising the director Park Chan-wook, wrote "A world-class artist at the top of his game...all while navigating multilayered plots that continue to deliver surprises right up until the end. It's a luxury to put yourself as a viewer in such capable hands."

Peter Howell of Toronto Star rated the film 4 out of 4 and wrote "every frame is like a painting, with hints to character motivation and plot twists."

Rafael Motamayor of Slash Film rated the film 7 out of 10 and wrote "This [the film] is not as surprising or innovative as director Park's earlier work, but it is still a fascinating and exquisitely directed film about desire, regret, and love."

Luke Goodsell of the Australian Broadcasting Corporation called the film "a testament to Park's undimmed talent...Decision to Leave is one of his best".

Wendy Ide gave it 5 stars out of 5 in The Guardian, describing it as an "enthralling, serpentine crime drama" that possesses "dangerously handsome cinematography, as precise as it is playful, is full of layers and flipped mirror images.

Accolades

Listicle

See also
 List of submissions to the 95th Academy Awards for Best International Feature Film
 List of South Korean submissions for the Academy Award for Best International Feature Film

References

External links
 
 
 
 Decision to Leave at Naver Movies

2022 multilingual films
2022 independent films
2022 romance films
2022 thriller films
2020s Korean-language films
2020s Mandarin-language films
2020s mystery thriller films
2020s romantic thriller films
2020s South Korean films
CJ Entertainment films
Films directed by Park Chan-wook
Films set in Busan
Films set in Gyeonggi Province
Police detective films
South Korean multilingual films
South Korean mystery thriller films
South Korean neo-noir films
South Korean romantic thriller films